Troy Brosnan (born 13 July 1993 in Adelaide, South Australia) is an Australian professional racing cyclist specialising in downhill mountain bike racing. As a junior, he was twice world champion, once Oceanian champion, and once Australian national champion in the downhill. In the elite category he has twice been third overall in the world cup and is a four-time Australian champion.

Career
Brosnan was junior downhill world champion in 2010 and 2011. He won the overall junior world cup in 2010 and 2011 and was Australian national downhill champion in 2011. He was junior continental champion of Oceania in 2011.

Brosnan has competed in the elite category since 2012. He was third overall in the downhill world cup in 2014 and won the third round of the series in Fort William, Scotland. He won the bronze medal in the downhill at the 2014 world championships in Hafjell, Norway. He was again third overall in the world cup series in 2015. Once again, he was third overall in the 2016 Downhill World Cup Series. In 2017 he won the fourth round of the 2017 Downhill World Cup in Vallnord, Andorra, and currently sits second in the overall series after the fifth round.

He won the first round of the 2021 Downhill World Cup season in Léogang, Austria.

Brosnan was Australian national downhill champion in 2012, 2014, 2015, 2016 and 2017.

References

External links
 Troy Brosnan's official website

1993 births
Living people
Australian male cyclists
Downhill mountain bikers
Cyclists from South Australia
UCI Mountain Bike World Champions (men)
Australian mountain bikers